Leon Klassen (born 29 May 2000) is a German Russian professional footballer who plays as a left-back for Russian club Spartak Moscow. He has represented Russia internationally at various youth levels.

Career
Klassen made his professional debut in the 3. Liga for 1860 Munich on 31 July 2019, coming on as a substitute in the 87th minute for Benjamin Kindsvater against FSV Zwickau. He assisted Herbert Paul for Munich's third goal, with the match finishing as a 3–0 home win.

On 27 May 2021, he signed with WSG Tirol in Austria.

On 30 December 2021, he signed a 3.5-year contract with Russian Premier League club FC Spartak Moscow.

Honours
Spartak Moscow
Russian Cup: 2021–22

Personal life
Klassen was born in Germany to a Russian father and a German mother.

Career statistics

References

External links
 
 
 
 Profile at RFS.ru

2000 births
Living people
People from Sinzig
Footballers from Rhineland-Palatinate
Russian footballers
Association football fullbacks
Russia youth international footballers
Russia under-21 international footballers
German footballers
German people of Russian descent
TSV 1860 Munich II players
TSV 1860 Munich players
WSG Tirol players
FC Spartak Moscow players
3. Liga players
Regionalliga players
Austrian Football Bundesliga players
Russian Premier League players
Russian expatriate footballers
Expatriate footballers in Austria
Russian expatriate sportspeople in Austria